, also known by the acronym JSL, is the dominant sign language in Japan and is a complete natural language, distinct from but influenced by the spoken Japanese language.

Population

There are 304,000 Deaf and Hard of Hearing people who are above age 18 in Japan (2008). However, there is no specific source about the number of JSL users because of the difficulty in distinguishing who are JSL users and who use other kinds of sign, like Taiou Shuwa and Chuukan Shuwa. According to the Japanese Association for Sign Language Studies, the estimated number of JSL users is around 60,000 in Japan.

History
Little is known about sign language and the deaf community before the Edo period. In 1862, the Tokugawa shogunate dispatched envoys to various European schools for the deaf but the first school for the deaf was not established until 1878 in Kyōto. It was founded by Tashiro Furukawa, who also developed what would become JSL.

Until 1948, deaf children were not required to attend school or to receive a formal education.

In the second half of the 20th century, a subtle cultural change in views about the Deaf in Japan evolved.  The long-standing concept that deaf only means "people who cannot hear" emphasized a physical impairment as part of a biomedical disease model; however, this was gradually replaced by a slightly different paradigm.  Deaf people were more often identified as people who use Japanese sign language.  In other words, the biomedical disability model began slowly to be displaced by a social-cultural or JSL paradigm.

The Japanese Federation of the Deaf has worked with slow success in efforts to enhance communication opportunities for Japanese whose primary language is JSL.

The changing status of JSL and the Deaf in Japan is a slow process, but there are highlights.  For example, JSL has an advocate among the Imperial family. Kiko, Princess Akishino has studied JSL and is a trained sign language interpreter.  She attends the Sign Language Speech Contest for High School Students held every August, and Praising Mothers Raising Children with Hearing Impairments every December.  In October 2008, she participated in the 38th National Deaf Women's Conference.  She also signs in informal Deaf gatherings.

The Deaf community supported passage of the proposed Sign Language Law.  The Basic Act for Persons with Disabilities was enacted in 2011.  This law recognized sign language as a language.

Interpreters
The slow integration of JSL within the context of Japanese culture has been accompanied by an expansion of the numbers of sign language interpreters:
 1991: Japanese Association of Sign Language Interpreters (JASLI) established
 1997: Ethics code of the Sign Language Interpreters established by JASLI
 2002: Japanese Federation of the Deaf and the National Research Association for Sign Language Interpretation established the National Training Institution of Sign Language

In 2006, the Japanese government amended the Supporting Independence of People with Disabilities Act.  The new language in the law encourages local governments to increase the number and use of JSL interpreters.

Other sign terms in Japan
Japanese Sign Language is often confused with other manually coded language for communicating that are used in Japan. JSL is a naturally evolved language, and like any other language has its own linguistic structures. Manual systems for expressing a spoken language often lead to ungrammatical structures and incomplete sentences in both the spoken and signed language. In Japan, there are three kinds of sign terms:
 Nihon Shuwa (JSL: Japanese Sign Language)Nihon Shuwa (JSL) is a natural language that is constructed by unique phonology, morphology, syntax, and semantics, like all languages.
In other words, Taiou Shuwa is not a sign language, but simply signed Japanese.
 Chuukan Shuwa (Pidgin Signed Japanese) Chuukan Shuwa combines JSL with Japanese language grammar. It is called contact sign in the United States.
A sign language among the sign terms is only JSL. However, those three kinds of sign terms are called  ('sign') widely in Japan.

These are not to be confused with the following, as they are distinct languages in separate language families:
 Amami Shuwa (AOSL: Amami Oshima Sign Language, also called Koniya Sign Language or Koniya Shuwa)
 Miyakubo Shuwa (also called Ehime-Oshima Sign Language)

The sign languages of Korea (KSL) and Taiwan (TSL) share some signs with JSL, perhaps due to cultural transfer during the period of Japanese occupation. JSL has about a 60% lexical similarity with Taiwanese Sign Language.

Deaf education
The conflict on the definition of JSL and Taiou Shuwa continues, and it affects Deaf education. In the 1990s, oral education, long in use, was replaced with the total communication method. Previously, Deaf children were forced to speak and banned from using sign language in all schools for the Deaf. With the total communication method, teachers use multiple modes of communication, including spoken language, written language, and simultaneous communication, to fit each Deaf child. The use of sign language spread in Japan at that time, but it was used along with speaking, called Taiou Shuwa.

In 2003, the Japan Deaf Children and Parents Association published a civil rights remedy statement called "Rights of Deaf children to education equality were infringed". They requested teachers who can teach JSL in all schools, and they demanded the JSL cambism course in all universities give a license for teachers of the Deaf. However, the Japanese Federation of the Deaf said "human rights may be infringed by distinguishing the two communication methods for users of JSL and Taiou Shuwa," with some agreement from the Japan Deaf Children and Parents Association. Finally, the Japan Federation of Bar Associations prepared the document "Opinion to require enriched sign education," and used the word sign instead of JSL. The statement did not have the power to add the requirement that teachers can teach in JSL in all schools for the Deaf.Currently, JSL is used in only one private school in Tokyo, Meisei Gakuen, and the other schools for the Deaf use other communication methods.

Bilingual education for Deaf in Japan
Bilingual education for the Deaf (see also Bilingual–bicultural education) aims to acquire JSL and written language. Some parents select other language modalities as well, like spoken language, to communicate with their children. Some parents also opt to use other tools, such as cochlear implants and hearing aids, for their Deaf children with sign language. In regards to Deaf education, using sign was cited in studies as it prevents from acquiring written language for a long time. 

However, recent articles have reported that children with fluency in a first language have the ability to acquire a second language, like other foreign language learners, even though the modalities are different. Therefore, the most important factor is to acquire fluency in one's first language. The future task is to consider how to bridge Japanese Sign Language and written language in bilingual education. 

In Japan, the bilingual education has been in free school (Tatsunoko Gakuen) since 1999 and school (Meisei Gakuen) since 2009.

Law
In 2011, the first sign language law was established on "language" as an act for persons with disabilities on July 29, and it was announced on August 5. After this, sign language was acknowledged as a form of language by law in Japan. 

In 2013, the first sign language law was established in Tottori Prefecture. The law stated "Sign is language". From then on, sign language law has spread across the country at the prefecture level. There are goals to establish a sign language law at the national level. 

However, there are two conflicting positions on sign language law as the sign language laws were not written in reference to JSL. One position claims that it is dangerous to mislead that sign language includes not only JSL, but also Taiou Shuwa (manually-coded Japanese or simultaneous communication) and Chuukan Shuwa (Contact Sign). The other claims that by establishing JSL, the language law makes it easy to discriminate against various sign users (deaf and mute people).

Diffusion among the hearing
Interest in sign language among the hearing population of Japan has been increasing, with numerous books now published targeting the hearing population, a weekly TV program teaching JSL, and the increasing availability of night school classes for the hearing to learn JSL. There have been several TV dramas, including Hoshi no Kinka (1995), in which signing has been a significant part of the plot, and sign language dramas are now a minor genre on Japanese TV.

The highly acclaimed 2006 film Babel, which was directed by Alejandro González Iñárritu and nominated for multiple Academy Awards,  also featured JSL as a significant element of the plot. Hearing actress Rinko Kikuchi received a Best Supporting Actress nomination for her signing role in this film. In Japan, about 40,000 signatures including both the hearing and deaf people were collected to subtitle the scene in Babel spoken in Japanese for the deaf audience.

The anime school drama film A Silent Voice, released in 2016, features a prominent deaf JSL-speaking character, Shōko Nishimiya. It was produced by Kyoto Animation, directed by Naoko Yamada, written by Reiko Yoshida, and featured character designs by Futoshi Nishiya. It is based on the manga of the same name written and illustrated by Yoshitoki Ōima. The film premiered in Japan on September 17, 2016.

Elements
As in other sign languages, JSL (usually called simply  , 'hand talk') consists of words, or signs, and the grammar with which they are put together. JSL signs may be nouns, verbs, adjectives, or any other part of a sentence, including suffixes indicating tense, negation, and grammatical particles. Signs consist not just of a manual gesture, but also  (pronouncing a standard Japanese word with or without making a sound). The same sign may assume one of two different but semantically related meanings, as for example in home and house, according to its mouthing. Another indispensable part of many signs is facial expression.

Each  corresponds to a kana, as illustrated by the JSL syllabary. Fingerspelling is used mostly for foreign words, last names, and unusual words.  is used to cover situations where existing signs are not sufficient.

Because JSL is strongly influenced by the complex Japanese writing system, it dedicates particular attention to the written language and includes elements specifically designed to express kanji in signs. For either conciseness or disambiguation, particular signs are associated with certain commonly used kanji, place names, and sometimes surnames.  (tracing kanji in the air) is also sometimes used for last names or place names, just as it is in spoken Japanese.

Examples of signs

Other sign languages in Japan
Some communities where deafness is relatively common and which have historically had little contact with mainland Japan have formed their own village sign languages:
 Koniya Sign Language in Amami Ōshima
 Miyakubo Sign Language in Miyakubo, Ehime
The increase in communication has led to an increasing influence of the Japanese sign over the village forms.

See also

 Manually coded language
 Japanese Sign Language family

Notes

References
 Chokaku Shogaisha Rikai no Tame , Kanagawa Prefecture Site accessed on August 27, 2009 
 
 Monaghan, Leila Frances. (2003). Many Ways to be Deaf: International Variation in Deaf Communities. Washington, D.C.: Gallaudet University Press. ;  OCLC 248814292
 Nakamura, Karen. (2006). Deaf in Japan: Signing and the Politics of Identity. Ithaca: Cornell University Press. ; ;  OCLC 238810838

External links
  Japanese Association of Sign Linguistics (JASL)
 手話教室 (online JSL lessons and dictionary, in Japanese)
 Online JSL dictionaries
  Kyoto Prefectural Education Center Website with explanations in English

Japanese Sign Language family
Languages of Japan
Sign languages of Japan